Mold is the fourth studio album made by experimental music group Praxis, released in 1998. Despite being released under the Praxis name the group's usual musicians, guitarist Buckethead and drummer Brain, are absent; frontman Bill Laswell is the only member that appeared on earlier releases to be included on the album.

Track listing

Personnel
 Praxis:
 Alex Haas - keyboards, producer, engineer, mixing
 Bill Laswell - bass, scratching, producer
 Pat Thrall - guitar
 Peter Wetherbee - synthesizer, guitar, drums, vocals, producer, loops, mixing, beats
 Julian Joyce - assistant engineer
 Joe Lambert - mastering
 Aldo Sampieri - art direction, photography

References

Praxis (band) albums
1997 albums
Albums produced by Bill Laswell